The 2016 African Artistic Gymnastics Championships was the 13th iteration of the event and took place on March 23–26 in Algiers, Algeria.

Medal winners

Senior

Junior

Medal table

Combined

Men

Women

References

Africa
International sports competitions hosted by Algeria
African Artistic Gymnastics Championships
African Artistic Gymnastics Championships